Miguel Tavares Veiga de Pina (born 26 February 1981 in Lisbon) is a Portuguese former professional footballer who played as a striker.

References

External links

1981 births
Living people
Footballers from Lisbon
Portuguese footballers
Association football forwards
ASA Issy players
Red Star F.C. players
Liga I players
ACF Gloria Bistrița players
Portuguese expatriate footballers
Expatriate footballers in France
Expatriate footballers in Romania
Portuguese expatriate sportspeople in France
Portuguese expatriate sportspeople in Romania